Nilakkottai (also spelled as Nilakottai) is a town in the Dindigul district of the Indian state of Tamil Nadu. The town was established in 1958, as 1st Grade Town Panchayat.  In 1970, it was changed to Selection Grade. The Town Panchayat has been under the municipal act since 1996. In 2004, it was called Special Village Panchayat, and in 2006, Selection Grade Town Panchayat.

History
Nilakottai palayam was one of 26 palayams in Dindigul province. Its founder, Kulappa Nayajar, came from Vijayanagaram in 1366 A.D. before the period of Vishwanatha Nayak.

Kulappa Nayak 
Nilakottai consists mainly of arable lands. As a reward for helping repel an invasion, Makkala Nayaka of the Kambala caste was rewarded by the emperor of Vijayanagar with the land west of Madura. In these lands, he built a mud fort Nilakkottai in 1366 A.D with permission from lord vishnu Devaraya Raya. Makkala ruled this fort for 12 years until he was succeeded by his son, Kulappa Nayaka. 

Both Kulappa Nayaka and Pandya King Chandra Sekara of Madura were deposed by a Chola Prince named Veera Sekara Chozha. Both defeated rulers appealed to Krishna Deva Raya for help and The Krishna Deva Raya sent Kotikam Nagama Nayakar to aid them. Nagama Nayakkar defeated the Chola ruler and took Madurai, but suddenly withdrew his allegiance and declined to help the Pandya king, usurping the throne. The Vijaya Nagar emperor demanded reprisal. Nayakkar's son, Vishwanaha, volunteered. He overthrew his father and handed him over to the emperor. As a reward for his loyalty, the emperor appointed Viswanha as the governor of Madurai. 

During Vishwanatha Nayakkar's rule, Tamil Nadu Kulappa Nayakkar aided him in numerous conflicts. When Pandiya assaulted Madurai country, Kulappa Nayakkar ended their revolt.

After Vishwanatha Nayakkar, Madurai was ruled by Krishappa Nayakkar (1554–1572).

Under British rules

Droughts prevented agricultural success in Nilakotttai, so Kulappa Nayakar was unable to pay his tribute to the British government. The conflict came to a head in 1797 when, after sending his family to Dobinayanakanur, the Polegar gathered forces in Kallarnadu, joined the revolt, and tried unsuccessfully to expel the British garrison from his fort. .

Geography
It has an average elevation of 320 metres (1049 feet).

Demographics
 India census, Nilakkottai had a population of 19,630. Males constitute 50% of the population and females 50%. Nilakkottai has an average literacy rate of 71%, higher than the national average of 59.5%: male literacy is 76%, and female literacy is 66%. In Nilakkottai, 12% of the population is under 6 years of age.

Economy
Nilakottai is famous for its flower markets, which export to all parts of India and overseas. Madurai region's jasmine is famous because of Nilakottai. Nilakottai was in Madurai district but later joined the Dindugal district. Nilakottai is also famous for its brass vessels and goldsmiths. There is an industrial estate established by SIPCOT, which features manufacturing and assembling units such as Fenner (India) limited, Dharani Rubber private limited, Amway, and TAFE Tractor Company.
International Agricultural Processing Private Limited (IAP), a leading vegetables processing company focussed on 100% exports, is located in Musavanuthu village, Nilakottai
https://cdn.s3waas.gov.in/s3f74909ace68e51891440e4da0b65a70c/uploads/2018/05/2018052936.pdf

Government

Nilakottai assembly constituency (Reserved) is part of Dindigul (Lok Sabha constituency).

Education

Public and private schools 

 Damien Public School, Tamil Nadu
 Royal Nursery & Primary school
 Karunai Dhan Nps, Nilakottai Primary School
 St. Joseph's Primary School, Batlagundu 
 HNUPR Matriculation Higher Secondary School Nilakottai
 Kumarappa Chettiar Memorial Matriculation Higher Secondary School Nilakottai
 Diraviam Government Girls Higher Secondary School Kamalapuram
 HNUPR Girls Higher Secondary School Nilakottai
 R. C. Higher Secondary School Michealpalayam
 R. C. Higher Secondary School Silukkuvarpatti
 Jeya Matriculation School, Bangalpatty
 Nadar High School, Nilakottai
 Nadar Middle School, Nilakottai, Tamil Nadu
 St. Josephs Middle School Silukkuvarpatti

Higher education 
 Government Arts College For Women, Nilakottai (Affiliated to Mother Teresa Women's University, Kodaikanal)
 Sri Soorya Group of Institutions Kulathupatty

Hospitals
 Government Hospital
 ESI Dispensary
 Muthu multi-specialty hospital
 Valarmathi Clini
 Jaishree Clinic
 Baagyalakshmi Hospital
 Selvaraj Hospital
 Sri Palaniyappa Hospital
 D34 Dental Hospital

References

 Cities and towns in Dindigul district
Palayam